Zereg is a sum (district) of Khovd Province in western Mongolia. The administrative center is Altanteel. The sum is 130 km away from the city of Khovd.

Notable Natives & Residents
 Tsakhiagiin Elbegdorj, Fourth President of Mongolia (2009-2017)

References 

Districts of Khovd Province